Melittia endoxantha is a moth of the family Sesiidae. It is known from Mozambique and Tanzania.

References

Sesiidae
Lepidoptera of Mozambique
Lepidoptera of Tanzania
Moths of Sub-Saharan Africa
Moths described in 1919